The Dorset Premier Football League is a football league based in Dorset, England, which sits at Step 7 of the National League System, or level 11 of the overall English football league system.

History
The league was formed in 1957 under the name Dorset Football Combination League when a number of senior clubs within the county became disillusioned at being dictated to by junior and minor clubs.

The objective of the league on its formation was to increase the standard of football and competition throughout Dorset and neighbouring counties, an ideal that still holds today.

In 1991 the Dorset Football Combination League accepted an invitation to become a feeder to the Wessex League, thus giving its member clubs the opportunity to progress through the National League System.  The league has now been placed at the Regional Feeder League level of the National League System, standing parallel to the Hampshire Premier League.  Clubs promoting from the DPL usually join the 2nd level of the Wessex League.  However, the conclusion of the 2005–06 season saw Sherborne Town move to the Western League Division One.  Bridport, who maintain a reserve team in the DPL, also play in the Western League. The bottom club may be relegated to the Dorset Senior League, which is a level 12 league of the English football pyramid.

The 2002–03 season saw the League change its name to the Dorset Premier Football League. It was felt that this more reflected the League's status. In 2010 the League was awarded the FA Charter Standard status, only the third league in the FA’s jurisdiction to be so awarded.

Recent champions

Member clubs (2022–23)

 Balti Sports
 Blandford United
 Bournemouth Sports
 Bridport Reserves
 Dorchester Sports
 Hamworthy United Reserves
 Holt United
 Merley Cobham Sports
 Poole Borough 
 Portland United Reserves
 Shaftesbury Town Reserves
 Sherborne Town Reserves
 Sturminster Marshall
 Sturminster Newton United
 Swanage Town & Herston
 Wareham Rangers
 Westland Sports
 Wimborne Town Reserves

Locations 2021-22

References

External links
Official Website

 
Sports leagues established in 1957
Football leagues in England
1957 establishments in England
Football in Dorset